Eduardo Andre Cocherari Cohen (born January 23, 1980) is a Guatemalan international footballer who most recently played for Deportivo Petapa.

Early life
Cocherari was born in San Salvador, El Salvador, the son of the Argentine former footballer Raúl Héctor Cocherari, who was playing for Alianza FC as an expatriate. Therefore, he held dual Salvadoran-Argentine nationality. During his childhood, he lived in Guatemala, then becoming a citizen of that country. Cocherari came back to El Salvador in the 90s when his father was signed as coach of Cojutepeque FC.

Club career
El Salvador-born Cocherari played for ADET, San Salvador F.C. and Alianza F.C. in El Salvador and Aurora F.C. in Guatemala before joining Petapa in 2004. In 2005, he scored the second goal that definitely lifted Petapa back into the Guatemalan Premier League

International career
Cocherari made his debut for Guatemala in a May 2001 UNCAF Nations Cup match against Costa Rica and has, as of January 2010, earned a total of 6 caps, scoring no goals. He has collected all of his caps at that UNCAF Cup tournament.

Honours
Primera División de Fútbol Profesional: 1
 2003

Personal life
Cocherari's mother, Lucy Cohen, is also from Argentina. Despite her Jewish surname, she is a Christian.

External links

References

1980 births
Living people
Sportspeople from San Salvador
Salvadoran expatriates in Guatemala
Naturalized citizens of Guatemala
People of Argentine-Jewish descent
Salvadoran people of Jewish descent
Salvadoran people of Argentine descent
Sportspeople of Argentine descent
Salvadoran footballers
Guatemalan footballers
Guatemalan people of Argentine descent
Association football midfielders
Alianza F.C. footballers
Comunicaciones F.C. players
San Salvador F.C. footballers
Aurora F.C. players
2001 UNCAF Nations Cup players
Copa Centroamericana-winning players
Guatemala international footballers
Deportivo Petapa players
Salvadoran emigrants to Guatemala